Cairn.info is a French-language web portal, founded in 2005, containing scholarly materials in the humanities and social sciences. Much of the collection is in French, but it also includes an English-language international interface to facilitate use by non-francophones. Primary research areas include communications, economics, education, geography, history, literature, linguistics, philosophy, political science, law, psychology, sociology, and cultural studies. The site provides gratis open access  to some publications.

It has since expanded to include publications from multiple other publishers, including extensive collections of French-language journals – 150,000 journal articles and 4000 books.

Titles 

The following list includes some examples of journals in Cairn.info:

 A contrario
 Actes de la recherche en sciences sociales
 Actuel Marx
 Adolescence
 Afrique & Histoire
 Afrique contemporaine
 Agora débats/jeunesses
 Annales de démographie historique
 Annales de géographie
 Annales. Histoire, Sciences Sociales
 L'Année balzacienne
 L'Année psychanalytique internationale
 L'Année sociologique
 Archives d'histoire doctrinale et littéraire du Moyen Âge
 Archives de philosophie
 
 L'autre
 Autrepart
 Bulletin de psychologie
 Cahiers critiques de thérapie familiale et de pratiques de réseaux
 Cahiers d'études africaines
 Les Cahiers de l'Orient
 Cahiers de psychologie clinique
 Cahiers du genre
 Cahiers du monde russe
 Cahiers internationaux de psychologie soiale
 Cahiers philosophiques
 Le Carnet Psy
 Carrefours de l'éducation
 Champ psy
 Chimères
 Cités
 La Clinique lacanienne
 Cliniques méditerranéennes
 Clio. Femmes, genre, histoire
 Communications
 Comptabilité-contrôle-audit
 Confluences Méditerranée
 Connexions
 Le Coq-Héron
 Critique
 Critique internationale
 Le Débat
 Devenir
 Déviance et société
 Dialogue
 Diogène
 Distances et savoirs
 Dix-huitième siècle
 Dix-septième siècle
 Document numérique
 Documentaliste - Sciences de l'information
 Droit et société
 Économie et prévision
 Économie internationale
 L'Économie politique
 Économie rurale
 Éducation et sociétés
 Éla
 Enfances et psy
 L'En-je lacanien
 Entreprises et histoire
 
 Espaces et sociétés
 Esprit
 Ethnologie française
 Études économiques de l'OCDE
 Les Études philosophiques
 Étvdes
 Études rurales
 L'Expansion Management Review
 Flux
 Formation emploi
 Genèses
 Gestion
 Géographie, économie, société
 Gradhiva
 Hérodote
 Histoire et sociétés rurales
 Histoire de l'éducation
 L'Homme
 L'Homme et la Société
 Idées économiques et sociales
 Imaginaire et inconscient
 Innovations
 Journal français de psychiatrie
 Journal de la psychanalyse de l'enfant
 Journal des psychologues
 Journal international de bioéthique
 Langage et société
 Langue française
 La Lettre de l'enfance et de l'adolescence
 Littératures classiques
 Management & Avenir
 M@n@gement
 Mil neuf cent. Revue d'histoire intellectuelle
 Médiologie|Médium / Cahiers de médiologie
 Mondes en développement
 Mouvements
 Mots. Les langages du politique
 Le Mouvement social
 Le Moyen Âge
 Multitudes
 Natures Sciences Sociétés
 Négociations

 Nouvelle revue de psychosociologie
 
 Parlement(s): Revue d'histoire politique
 Participations
 Pensée plurielle
 Perspectives économiques de l'OCDE
 Philosophia Scientiæ
 Philosophie
 Poétique
 Politique africaine
 Politique américaine
 Politique étrangère
 Politique européenne
 
 Population
 Pouvoirs
 Psychanalyse
 Psychologie clinique et projective
 Présence africaine
 Projet
 La Psychiatrie de l'enfant
 Psychothérapies
 Psychotropes
 Quaderni
 Raisons politiques
 Recherches de science religieuse
 Reflets et perspectives de la vie économique
 Réformes économiques
 Regards croisés sur l'économie
 Réseaux
 Retraite et société
 Revue archéologique
 Revue congolaise de gestion
 Revue d'anthropologie des connaissances
 Revue d'assyriologie et d'archéologie orientale
 Revue d'économie du développement
 Revue d'économie industrielle
 Revue d'économie politique
 
 Revue d'éthique et de théologie morale
 Revue de littérature comparée
 Revue de l'OFCE
 Revue de métaphysique et de morale
 Revue de philologie, de littérature et d'histoire anciennes
 Revue de psychothérapie psychanalytique de groupe
 Revue de l'histoire des religions
 Revue d'histoire moderne et contemporaine
 Revue d'histoire des sciences
 Revue d'histoire des sciences humaines
 Revue d'histoire littéraire de la France
 Revue de neuropsychologie
 Revue des sciences de gestion
 Revue du MAUSS
 Revue économique
 Revue économique de l'OCDE
 Revue européenne des migrations internationales
 Revue française d'administration publique
 Revue française des affaires sociales
 Revue française d'études américaines
 Revue française de gestion
 Revue française d'histoire des idées politiques
 Revue française de linguistique appliquée
 Revue française de pédagogie
 Revue française de psychanalyse
 Revue française de psychosomatique
 Revue française de science politique
 Revue française de socio-économie
 Revue française de sociologie
 Revue internationale de droit économique
 Revue internationale de philosophie
 Revue internationale de politique comparée
 Revue internationale de psychologie sociale
 Revue internationale de psychosociologie
 Revue internationale des sciences sociales
 Revue internationale et stratégique
 Revue philosophique
 Revue Tiers Monde
 Rue Descartes
 Santé publique
 Savoirs et clinique
 Science et motricité
 Sciences du Design
 Sciences Sociales et Santé
 Sciences sociales et sport
 Sève : Les Tribunes de la santé
 Sociétés
 Sociétés contemporaines
 Sociologie
 Sociologies pratiques
 Spirale : La Grande Aventure de monsieur Bébé
 Staps
 Sud/Nord : Folies et cultures
 Le Temps des médias
 Terrain
 Terrains et travaux
 Thérapie familiale
 Topique
 Tracés
 Transversalités
 Le Travail humain 
 Travailler
 Travaux de linguistique
 Vie sociale et traitements
 Vingtième siècle : Revue d'histoire
 Volume ! La Revue des musiques populaires

References

External links
 
 Cairn.info International Edition

Internet properties established in 2005
Publishing companies of France
Publishing companies of Belgium
Full-text scholarly online databases
Academic publishing
Educational publishing companies
Commercial digital libraries
Belgian digital libraries